Red Nails is a 1977 collection of three fantasy short stories and one essay  by American writer Robert E. Howard, featuring his  sword and sorcery hero Conan the Barbarian. The collection was edited by Karl Edward Wagner. It was first published in hardcover by Berkley/Putnam in 1977, and in paperback by Berkley Books the same year. It was reprinted in hardcover for the Science Fiction Book Club, also in 1977, and combined with the Wagner-edited The Hour of the Dragon and The People of the Black Circle in the book club's omnibus edition The Essential Conan in 1998. The stories originally appeared in the fantasy magazine Weird Tales in the 1930s.

The pieces in Red Nails, in common with those in the other Conan volumes produced by Karl Edward Wagner for Berkley, are based on the originally published form, of the texts in preference to the edited versions appearing in the earlier Gnome Press and Lancer editions of the Conan stories. In contrast to the earlier editions, which included Conan tales by authors other than Howard, Wagner took a purist approach, including only stories by Howard, and only those thought to be in the public domain. His editorial comments dismiss editorial revisions made in the earlier editions.

Contents
"Foreword" by Karl Edward Wagner
"Beyond the Black River"
"Shadows in Zamboula"
"Red Nails"
"The Hyborian Age" (essay)
"Afterword" by Karl Edward Wagner

1977 short story collections
Conan the Barbarian books
Conan the Barbarian books by Robert E. Howard
Fantasy short story collections
Berkley Books books

fr:Conan : Les Clous rouges